Léonce-Henri Burel (23 November 1892 – 21 March 1977) was a French cinematographer whose career extended from the silent era until the early 1970s. He was the director of photography on more than 120 films, working almost exclusively in black-and-white.

Career 
After studying at the University of Nantes, he initially worked as a photoengraver before becoming a camera operator. At the Film d'Art company in 1915 he was noticed by Abel Gance and began a collaboration with him which extended over 16 films, including J'accuse, La Roue, and Napoléon. In the period of silent films he also worked on several productions with Jacques Feyder. During the 1930s he worked regularly with Jean Dréville and Henri Decoin.  With Le Journal d'un curé de campagne, for which he won the best cinematography award at the Venice Film Festival in 1951, Burel began another important collaboration with the director Robert Bresson which continued through three further films. Burel also directed three films himself between 1922 and 1932.

Selected filmography
 1915: La Folie du docteur Tube, directed by Abel Gance
 1917: Mater dolorosa (The Torture of Silence), directed by Abel Gance
 1918: La Dixième Symphonie (The Tenth Symphony), directed by Abel Gance
 1918: Le Comte de Monte Cristo, directed by Henri Pouctal
 1919: J'accuse, directed by Abel Gance
 1921: La Roue, directed by Abel Gance
 1922: Crainquebille, directed by Jacques Feyder
 1925: Visages d'enfants (Faces of Children), directed by Jacques Feyder
 1926: Michel Strogoff, directed by Victor Tourjansky
 1927: Napoléon, directed by Abel Gance
 1927: Casanova (The Loves of Casanova), directed by Alexandre Volkoff
 1928: L'Équipage (The Crew), directed by Maurice Tourneur 
 1929: The Three Passions, directed by Rex Ingram
 1929: Vénus, directed by Louis Mercanton
 1930: Nuits de princes (Nights of Princes), directed by Marcel L'Herbier
 1931: La Femme d'une nuit, directed by Marcel L'Herbier 
 1932: La Femme nue (The Nude Woman), directed by Jean-Paul Paulin
 1934:  Le Petit Jacques (Little Jacques), directed by Gaston Roudès
 1938: Retour à l'aube (Return at Dawn), directed by Henri Decoin
 1940: Vénus aveugle, directed by Abel Gance
 1942: La Belle Aventure  (The Beautiful Adventure), directed Marc Allégret
 1949:  Suzanne et ses brigands (Suzanne and the Robbers), directed by Yves Ciampi
 1949: Valse brillante (Brilliant Waltz), directed by Jean Boyer
 1949:  Le Mystère Barton (The Barton Mystery), directed by Charles Spaak
 1951: Journal d'un curé de campagne (Diary of a Country Priest), directed by Robert Bresson
 1955: La Madone des sleepings (Madonna of the Sleeping Cars), directed by Henri Diamant-Berger
 1956: Un condamné à mort s'est échappé (A Man Escaped), directed by Robert Bresson
 1959: Pickpocket, directed by Robert Bresson
 1962: Procès de Jeanne d'Arc (The Trial of Joan of Arc), directed by Robert Bresson
 1963: Chair de poule, directed by Julien Duvivier

References

External links

"Léonce-Henri Burel", in Internet Encyclopedia of Cinematographers. [Retrieved 24 May 2015.]
"Léonce-Henri Burel", in Dictionnaire du cinéma français des années vingt, covering particularly Burel's work with Gance and Feyder in the 1920s. [Retrieved 24 May 2015.] In French.
"Burel & Bresson: interview by Rui Nogueira, translation and introduction by Tom Milne", in Sight and Sound, Winter 1976/1977, vol. 46(1), pp. 18-21. Republished online on the BFI website (September 2020); archived at the Wayback Machine. [Retrieved 30 April 2021].

1892 births
1977 deaths
French cinematographers